Johan Dahl (born 19 September 1959) is a Faroese politician currently in the Logting.

References

1959 births
Living people
Members of the Løgting
Faroese politicians
Union Party (Faroe Islands) politicians
Place of birth missing (living people)